Dr JS Moroka Local Municipality is located in the Nkangala District Municipality of Mpumalanga province, South Africa. The seat of Dr JS Moroka Local Municipality is Siyabuswa.

Main places
The 2001 census divided the municipality into the following main places:

Politics 

The municipal council consists of sixty-two members elected by mixed-member proportional representation. Thirty-one are elected by first-past-the-post voting in thirty-one wards, while the remaining thirty-one are chosen from party lists so that the total number of party representatives is proportional to the number of votes received. In the election of 3 August 2016 the African National Congress (ANC) won a majority of forty-three seats on the council.

The following table shows the results of the 2016 election.

In a by-election held on 8 January 2019, a ward previously held by the ANC was won by an independent candidate. Council composition was reconfigured as seen below:

References

External links 
 Official homepage

Local municipalities of the Nkangala District Municipality